is a yamajiro-style Japanese castle located in the city of Inuyama, Aichi Prefecture, Japan. The castle overlooks the Kiso River, which serves as the border between Aichi and Gifu Prefectures. The tenshu of Inuyama Castle, one of only 12 pre-modern tenshu remaining in existence, is determined to the oldest remaining tenshu, dating from the late 1580s. The castle has been a National Historic Site since 2018.

Background
Inuyama Castle is located on a hill overlooking the Kiso River in what is now the city of Inuyama. Inuyama Castle is the oldest of 12 castles to have retained its Tenshukaku intact.  This main tower is small but due to its complex form, it shows different silhouettes depend on the angle. Among the 12 remaining main towers, the tenshu at Inuyama Castle is designated as a National Treasure of Japan, as are Matsumoto Castle, Hikone Castle and Himeji Castle.

History
According to the Heian period Engishiki a Shinto shrine, the Haritsuna Shrine was moved to make way for the castle. The structure was rebuilt several times in the Muromachi period and the current configuration was largely the work of Oda Nobukatsu, Oda Nobunaga's son. The antiquated architectural style of the watchtower atop the tenshu has in the past led many historians to believe this to be the oldest extant tenshu in Japan, which was confirmed through tree rings in the construction materials dating the structure to the 1580s. Construction and renovations continued through 1620.

Inuyama Castle was the final obstacle against Oda Nobunaga's unification of Owari Province.  After Nobunaga had defeated the Imagawa clan at the Battle of Okehazama in 1560, his cousin, Oda Nobukiyo, seized Inuyama Castle with the support of Saito Yoshitatsu on Mino Province. Nobunaga recaptured the castle in 1564. After Nobunaga's death, Toyotomi Hideyoshi appointed Ishikawa Sadakiyo as castellan of Inuyama. Ishikawa rebuilt the defenses of the castle in line with contemporary designs and the current shape of the donjon is a result of this reconstruction. After the Battle of Sekigahara, the victorious Tokugawa Ieyasu expelled the Ishikawa clan and turned the castle over to Owari Domain.

Under the Tokugawa shogunate, the castle was governed by the Naruse clan, who ruled as daimyō of Inuyama Domain as vassals of the Owari Tokugawa clan until the Meiji restoration. The new Meiji government seized Inuyama Castle in 1871 and destroyed all of its auxiliary buildings except for the tenshu; however, after the castle was damaged in the Great Nōbi earthquake, and it was returned to the Naruse family in 1895, on the condition that they repair and maintain it. The castle was thus unique in Japan in that it was privately owned.

In 2004, ownership of the castle was turned over to a non-profit foundation set up by the Aichi Prefecture's Board of Education.

It was long believed that the tenshu of Inuyama Castle was moved to the castle from Kanayama Castle in 1599, until such theory was disproved as a result of examination through a large scale restoration work, involving the dismantling of the tenshu, carried out between 1961 and 1965.

Castle Rulers
The castellans of Inuyama Castle are listed below in order with their dates of reign in parentheses. There were no castellans from 1612–1617 and 1869–1895.
Pre-Naruse Clan
Oda Nobuyasu (1537–1547)
Oda Nobuyuki (1547–1564)
Ikeda Nobuteru (1570–1581)
Oda Nobufusa (1581–1582)
Nakagawa Sadanari (1582–1584)
Ikeda Nobuteru (1584)
Katō Yasukage (1584, proxy ruler)
Takeda Kiyotoshi (1584–1587, proxy ruler)
Hijikata Katsuyoshi (1587–1590, proxy ruler)
Nagao Yoshifusa (1590–1592, proxy ruler)
Miwa Gorōemon (1592–1595)
Ishikawa Mitsuyoshi (1595–1600)
Ogasawara Yoshitsugu (1601–1607)
Hiraiwa Chikayoshi (1607–1612)
Naruse Clan
Naruse Masanari (1617–1625)
Naruse Masatora (1625–1659)
Naruse Masachika (1659–1703)
Naruse Masayuki (1703–1732)
Naruse Masamoto (1732–1768)
Naruse Masanori (1768–1809)
Naruse Masanaga (1809–1838)
Naruse Masazumi (1838–1857)
Naruse Masamitsu (1857–1869, 1895–1903)
Naruse Masao (1903–1949)
Naruse Masakatsu (1949–1973)
Naruse Masatoshi (1973–2004)

See also
List of National Treasures of Japan (castles)
List of Historic Sites of Japan (Aichi)

Literature

References

External links

  Inuyama Castle official site
  Inuyama Castle official site
 Guide to Japanese Castles
 Japan Guide
 The Yamasa Institute 

Castles in Aichi Prefecture
National Treasures of Japan
Historic Sites of Japan
Museums in Aichi Prefecture
History of Aichi Prefecture
Owari Province
Inuyama, Aichi